Porter House, Porter Estate, or Porter Cabin may refer to:

Porter-French House, in Orange, California, listed on the NRHP in California
John Porter House, 777 Pearl Street, Denver, Colorado, a Denver Landmark
Porter House (Denver, Colorado), a Denver Landmark
Dr. J. Porter House, in Southington, Connecticut
Thomas V. Porter House, in Jacksonville, Florida
Dr. Joseph Y. Porter House, in Key West, Florida
Porter-York House, in Clarkesville, Georgia, listed on the NRHP in Georgia
Gene Stratton-Porter Cabin (Geneva, Indiana)
Gene Stratton-Porter Cabin (Rome City, Indiana)
Ellsworth-Porter House, in Decorah, Iowa
Porter-Rhynsburger House, in Pella, Iowa
Porter-Todd House, in Louisville, Kentucky
Bradford Porter House, in Nebo, Kentucky, listed on the NRHP in Kentucky
Porter-Bell-Brackley Estate, in Strong, Maine
Porter–Phelps–Huntington House, in Hadley, Massachusetts
John J. and Eva Reynier Porter Estate, in South Arm Township, Michigan
Porter-Crawford House, in Meridian, Mississippi
Porter House (Raymond, Mississippi)
Porter-Thomsen House, in Omaha, Nebraska, listed on the NRHP in Nebraska
General Porter House, in Portsmouth, New Hampshire
Peck-Porter House, in Walpole, New Hampshire
Rev. Dr. Elbert S. Porter House, in Claverack, New York
Porter House New York, a steakhouse in New York City
Porter House (Syracuse, New York)
Porter Houses and Armstrong Kitchen, in Whitakers, North Carolina
Porter-Aue House, in Clinton, Ohio, listed on the NRHP in Ohio
Orin Porter House, in Hudson, Ohio, listed on the NRHP in Ohio
Porter-Brasfield House, in Shedd, Oregon, listed on the NRHP in Oregon
Porter-Leath, in Memphis, Tennessee
Porter House (Paris, Tennessee), in Paris, Tennessee
Stephen Porter House, in Rockford, Tennessee, listed on the NRHP in Tennessee
William Sidney Porter House, in Austin, Texas
Katherine Anne Porter House, in Kyle, Texas
Nathan T. and Anna Porter House, in Centerville, Utah
Walworth D. Porter Duplex Residence in Baraboo, Wisconsin

See also 
 Porterhouse (disambiguation)